McGuff is a surname. Notable people with the surname include:

Kevin McGuff (born 1969), American women's basketball coach
Joe McGuff (1926–2006), American journalist, author, and newspaper editor

See also
McGuff Companies, an American company